The Welsh Bridge is a masonry arch viaduct in the town of Shrewsbury, England, which crosses the River Severn. It connects Frankwell with the town centre. It is a Grade II* listed building.

The bridge was designed and built from 1793 to 1795 by John Tilley and John Carline (whose namesake father was a mason on the English Bridge), who had built Montford Bridge for Thomas Telford. It replaced the medieval St George's Bridge. Four of the arches span 43 feet 4 inches, while the fifth and central arch is 46 feet 2 inches. The bridge is 30 feet wide, and built from Grinshill sandstone. In total it is 266 feet long. It was completed in 1795 at a cost of £8,000.

On the south end of the bridge, on the junction with Victoria Avenue, one of the parapets of the bridge has the words "Commit No Nuisance" chiselled into the stone. This is an archaic injunction not to urinate in public.

Gallery

See also 
Crossings of the River Severn

References 

Blackwall, Anthony, Historic Bridges of Shropshire, Shropshire Libraries, 1985, 
Cragg, R., Civil Engineering Heritage - Wales & West Central England, Thomas Telford Publishing, 2nd edn., 1997, 
Listed status at Borough Council

Bridges across the River Severn
Bridges in Shrewsbury
Bridges completed in 1795
Grade II* listed buildings in Shropshire
Grade II* listed bridges in England